Cuitláhuac (c. 1476 – 1520)  or Cuitláhuac (in Spanish orthography; , , honorific form: Cuitlahuatzin) was the 10th Huey Tlatoani (emperor) of the Aztec city of Tenochtitlan for 80 days during the year Two Flint (1520). He is credited with leading the resistance to the Spanish and Tlaxcalteca conquest of the Mexica Empire, following the death of his kinsman Moctezuma II.

Biography
Cuitláhuac was the eleventh son of the ruler Axayacatl and a younger brother of Moctezuma II, the late Emperor of Tenochtitlan, who died during the Spanish occupation of the city. His mother's father, also called Cuitlahuac, had been ruler of Iztapalapa, and the younger Cuitláhuac also ruled there initially.  Cuitláhuac was an experienced warrior and an adviser to Moctezuma, warning him not to allow the Spaniards to enter Tenochtitlan. Hernán Cortés imprisoned both Moctezuma and Cuitláhuac. Following the massacre of Aztec elites when Cortés was away from Tenochtitlan, the Mexica besieged the Spanish and their indigenous allies. Cuitláhuac was released on the pretense to reopen the market to get food to the invaders. Moctezuma was killed under disputed circumstances, and Cuitláhuac was elected tlatoani following the flight of the Spaniards and their allies from Tenochtitlan on June 30, 1520.  Some sources claim he was serving in that role even before Moctezuma's death.

Cuitláhuac was ritually married to Moctezuma's eldest daughter, a ten- or eleven-year-old girl, who later was called Isabel Moctezuma.

Cuitláhuac ruled just 80 days, perhaps dying from smallpox that had been introduced to the New World by an African suffering from the disease who was part of Pánfilo de Narváez's expedition to capture Cortés. The early sources do not explicitly say from what he succumbed. Immediately after Cuitláhuac's death, Cuauhtémoc was made the next tlatoani.

Legacy
The modern Mexican municipality of Cuitláhuac, Veracruz and the Mexico City Metro station Metro Cuitláhuac are named in honor of Cuitláhuac. The asteroid 2275 Cuitláhuac is also named after this ruler.

There is an Avenue in Mexico City Called Cuitláhuac (Eje 3 Norte) that runs from Avenue Insurgentes to Avenue Mexico-Tacuba and that is part of an inner ring; also many streets in other towns and villages in Mexico are so called.

See also

List of Tenochtitlan rulers

Notes

References

External links

 
 

 
 

Aztec nobility
Tenochca tlatoque
16th-century monarchs in North America
16th-century indigenous people of the Americas
1470s births
1520 deaths
Deaths from smallpox

1520 in Mexico

16th century in the Aztec civilization
1520 in North America
1520s in the Aztec civilization
Nobility of the Americas